The Murray Theater is a theater located in Murray, a suburb of Salt Lake City, Utah. It is listed on the National Register of Historic Places, and is one of the area's best examples of the Art Moderne style in theater architecture. The theater operated as both a first-run and second-run venue for motion pictures, and has been extensively renovated and redesigned during its history.

History

The Murray Theater, located at 4961 South State Street in Murray, Utah, was built in 1938 by Tony Duvall, who built the Gem and New Iris theaters in Murray, and Joseph L. Lawrence, who built the Villa and Southeast in Salt Lake and the Academy in Provo. It opened on 28 October 1938. The Murray Theater opened on 28 October 1938, showing “Alexander’s Ragtime Band” and “Hawaiian Holiday”. Advertisements from local papers show that it screened two of Hollywood's first major color films: Gone with the Wind and The Wizard of Oz.

The Murray Eagle reported the new theater had a white front: “...amply lighted with the latest type of (fluorescent) lighting and the marquee and vertical sign trimmed in ruby red. The box office and entrance has been furnished in stainless steel. The lighting in the foyer and inner lobby is all in indirect tubing and is designed to blend harmoniously with the delicate wall decorations and the heavy red floor carpets. The spacious auditorium is fitted with full upholstered chairs which are so situated that every patron may have an unobstructed view of the screen. The auditorium is also lighted with concealed tubing. The aisles are five and one-half feet wide. The latest microphonic sound system and projection equipment has been installed. The theater has been provided with air conditioning, as well as large rest rooms with an ‘ultra-modern’ lounge for the ladies.” In September 1964, Art M. Jolley purchased the Murray from Fox-Intermountain Theaters. By the end of January 1965 he completed a $15,000 “modernization program” on the theater. In 1981, Mr. Jolley sold the Murray to another party, but later he took the theater back. In 1989, after the death of Art Jolley, the Jolley family sold the theater to his son-in-law, Steve Webb. Steve Webb operated the Murray as a second-run theater, with the help of his wife and children, and his brother. The Murray closed for two days, starting 28 October 1992, so the stage could be enlarged to accommodate live performances. Vandermeide, who had been performing at the Avalon, then moved his hypnotist show to the Murray. In October 1999 the Murray Theater closed suddenly. The theater was to be auctioned in February 2000.

In October 2001, the Murray Theater was bought by the Murray Unity Spiritual Center. The interior was remodeled with a bookstore, a Sunday School, a prayer room, and a new coffee shop. The auditorium became a 550-seat sanctuary. The Unity Spiritual Center vacated the theater in the summer of 2004 and the theater. In early 2006 the theater was remodeled as a live entertainment and dancing venue with a new stage, extensive sound, light and video technology and tiered seating platforms with a large dance floor.  A pizza restaurant, built in a connected building to the south of the theater operated as a part of the theater enterprise. In December 2007, the theater was named the Murray Super Theater and hosted a variety of musical acts cultural events, private parties, and wrestling venue. The owners of the Murray Super Theater folded operations during the Great Recession.

In 2015, Murray City bought the theater and incorporated it as part of its Murray City Center District redevelopment zone. The City announced in 2018 that it was investing in significant renovations to the theater to become a film and performance venue.

References

Theatres completed in 1938
Buildings and structures in Murray, Utah
Event venues established in 1938
Theatres on the National Register of Historic Places in Utah
1938 establishments in Utah
National Register of Historic Places in Salt Lake County, Utah